The Pittsburgh Business Times is a diversified business media company serving Pittsburgh, Pennsylvania. It publishes daily stories on its website and social networks, and a weekly edition available in print and online. It is published by the American City Business Journals.  Published since August 31, 1981 it was founded by the Business Journal Publications Company which merged the paper with the rival Pittsburgh Business Journal, owned by Scripps-Howard, on March 21, 1985. They combined operations by April 1 of that year. In 1986, Business Journal Publications was acquired by American City Business Journals. The paper was sold in 1988. American City Business Journals reacquired the Business Times in 1996 with purchase of CityMedia Inc.

External links

References

Business newspapers published in the United States
Newspapers published in Pittsburgh
1981 establishments in Pennsylvania